A ridge road is a road or track, usually ancient, that runs along the ridge formed by a line of hills.  Ridge Road may refer to:

Roads
Canada
Ridge Road, formerly Manitoba Provincial Road 303, in the Rural Municipality of Hanover

Ireland
Esker Riada, also known as Ridge Road

United States
Blue Ridge Road, a New York State Scenic Byway in Essex County, New York
Ridge Road (Western New York)
Ridge Route in California
Trail Ridge Road, one of the highest roads in the US, located in Rocky Mountain National Park
U.S. Route 6 Business (Gary, Indiana), a former route, part of which was named Ridge Road

Others
 "Ridge Road", a 2005 song by T-Pain from Rappa Ternt Sanga